Abhay Jodhpurkar (born 1991) is an Indian singer born in Madhya Pradesh. He debuted as a playback singer with the Kannada film God Father in 2012. He is best known for his song "Moongil Thottam", a duet with Harini for the Tamil film Kadal and "E Sanje Eke Jaruthide" for the Kannada film RangiTaranga. In 2018, he sang "Mere Naam Tu" for Zero, which marks his singing debut in Hindi cinema.

Early and Personal life
Abhay Jodhpurkar completed his Bachelors in Biotechnology from SRM Institute of Science and Technology, Chennai in 2013. Schooling at Sendhwa Public School, Sendhwa, Madhya Pradesh.

Singing career

Abhay has learnt Qawwali for two years and got the opportunity to sing in A.R. Rahman's Sufi albums. Abhay learnt Hindustani classical music for 3 years at Alaap music academy, Chennai from Kuldeep Sagar. His music journey started when he got into A.R. Rahman's school KM Music Conservatory.He started singing in different languages like Tamil, Telugu, Kannada and Malayalam as well as Hindi.

Discography

Awards

References

External links 

 Official Website

1991 births
Living people
Tamil playback singers
Kannada playback singers
Indian male playback singers
Telugu playback singers
Marathi playback singers
People from Madhya Pradesh
People from Jodhpur